Chor Machaye Shor is a 2002 Indian Hindi action comedy film. The film is directed by David Dhawan and stars Bobby Deol, Shilpa Shetty, and Bipasha Basu in the main leads while Paresh Rawal, Om Puri, Rajat Bedi, and Rajpal Yadav play supporting roles. The plot of this film is unofficial remake of 1999 Hollywood film Blue Streak (which itself is a remake of the 1965 British film The Big Job).

Plot
Shyam is a small-time thief who works as a security guard at a museum. He devises a plan with his three friends: Johnny, Titu and Tony to steal a particular Nizam diamond. The foursome successfully manages to steal the diamond only for Shyam to double-cross Titu and Tony. Johnny and Shyam escape with the diamond. Johnny escapes but Shyam is apprehended, before which he hides the diamond in an air duct of a dilapidated building. Shyam is sentenced for 2 years in prison.

2 years have passed and a freshly released Shyam heads towards the dilapidated building which housed the diamond, but much to his amazement, a new police headquarters is built in place of the dilapidated building. Shyam decides to portray a fake police inspector Ram to enter the building to steal the diamond. He attracts the attention of ACP Ranvir Singh for his heroism and Inspector Pandey, an inspector who frequently suspects Ram of his true identity. Ram even manages to romance Inspector Ranjita. In the midst of all this, Shyam tries his best to locate the diamond but is forced to enact as a cop to subdue criminals, such as Kalia Anthony  and his own friend Johnny. Before Johnny is arrested, Johnny calls Ram as Shyam which causes Pandey to become suspicious of Inspector Ram.

Ram later reveals that Shyam is actually his "twin" brother who is a rascal. Ranvir Singh makes it his job to reform Shyam, so Shyam is forced to balance both Inspector Ram and Shyam (who is employed as the driver of Ranvir) and he even manages to romance Ranvir's daughter Kajal. Shyam's other friend Guru  is forced to enact as Shyam/Ram's mother as Pandey keeps on suspecting Shyam/Ram while Ranvir seems oblivious to what is happening. Meanwhile, Titu and Tony come to know of Shyam's release and they come to know that the diamond is hidden somewhere inside the police headquarters. Posing as tea-boys, they threaten Shyam but Shyam retaliates and attacks causing them to retreat. Shyam and his other cronies devise a plan to convince Ranvir that doppelgangers (twins) exist, so they refer Ranvir as Raghu, who is a wanted drug smuggler.

Kajal, however, is the only one who finds out the real truth about Shyam/Ram. Then Ranvir finds out and gets enraged. Unaware, Tito and Tony find the actual doppelganger of Ranvir, Raghu Swami. And they threaten to make him pose as Ranvir so that it makes it easier to steal the diamond. Shyam finds out about this and thwarts Tito and Tony's plans. Shyam escapes with the diamond and ends up in a car retailer shop with both Tito and Tony following him. A fight ensues, however, the cops arrive to arrest Shyam, Tito, and Tony. Johnny then appears and presumably shoots Shyam and in turn, Shyam shoots Johnny. Both presumably die. Tito and Tony are arrested while the ever-suspicious Pandey finds out that the gun was fake, which meant that Johnny and Shyam did not really kill each other.

At the airport, Pandey and Ranvir bid farewell to Kajal who is going to London. Pandey and Ranvir are then confronted by three Sikhs, who are actually Guru, Shyam and Johnny in disguise (this also confirms that Johnny and Shyam are still alive). Pandey once again suspects them to be Shyam and refuses to believe that twins exist, but the tables turn when Pandey meets his own doppelganger, a Punjabi tourist, for a short while. The film ends with Shyam (disguised as a Sikh) who gifts Kajal a diamond ring which reveals that Kajal was going to marry Shyam in London.

Cast
Bobby Deol as Shyam Singh / Ram Singh
Shilpa Shetty as Kajal
Bipasha Basu as Ranjita
Paresh Rawal as Ranbir Singh / Raghuswami (dual role)
Om Puri as Pandey 
Ashish Vidyarthi as Tito
Rajat Bedi as Tony
Rajpal Yadav as Johnny
Shekhar Suman as Guru Shayam's friend / Vaijayanti Ram's mother / Mala 
Razak Khan Khali Anthony

Soundtrack
Music by Anu Malik.
 "Kaan Ke Neeche" - Vinod Rathod, Anuradha Sriram
 "Aankhein Hain Teri" - Udit Narayan, Dimple Verma
 "Chor Machaaye Shor" - Sonu Nigam
 "Chadh Gayi Chadh Gayi" - Sonu Nigam, Anuradha Sriram
 "Ishqan Ishqan" - Karsan Sargathiya, Sunidhi Chauhan, Adnan Sami
 "Tum Tata Ho Ya Birla" - Vinod Rathod, Anuradha Sriram

Critical response
Taran Adarsh of Bollywood Hungama gave the film 1 star out of 5, writing ″Bobby Deol gives his all to this role and seems comfortable in light scenes. Shekhar Suman gets into several get-ups, but he entertains most as Bobby's mother. Shilpa Shetty gets no scope to perform but dances exceptionally well. Bipasha Basu is wasted. Paresh Rawal is just about okay. Om Puri is competent. Ashish Vidyarthi and Rajat Bedi lend passable support. Rajpal Yadav impresses. On the whole, CHOR MACHAAYE SHOR stands on a weak foundation ? its script. Despite impressive names on and off screen, the film has precious little to impress an avid cinegoer. Priyanka Bhattacharya of Rediff.com wrote ″Chor Machaaye Shor is a typical Bollywood masala potboiler with fun, romance, music and mandatory dishum-dishum. But if you are attuned to and enjoy David Dhawan's brand of humour, then this one is a barrel of laughs.″

References

External links
 

2000s Hindi-language films
2002 films
Indian remakes of British films
Films directed by David Dhawan
Films scored by Anu Malik
Indian action comedy films
Indian remakes of American films
2002 action comedy films
2002 comedy films